Kachin cuisine is food originating from the Kachinland area, which includes the northern areas of Myanmar, as well as parts of China and Arunachal Pradesh, associated with Kachin. Outside of Kachinland, Kachin restaurants have opened in Yangon, and Kachin migrants have brought the cuisine to other countries.

Dishes
 Shat Jam, a rice dish made from boiled rice, beans, carrots, mushrooms, and fried onions. Can also include meat such as chicken, pork or beef. Also known as Kachin Danbauk in Burmese-speaking areas.  
 Shan Hkak, minced beef mixed with basil, garlic, ginger, chilies and pepper.
 Japhtu, a spicy side dish made of pounded chilies and garlic. There are many variations such as adding dried beef, fish, banana bud, or tomatoes.
 Si Pa, a vegetable curry made with rice powder. Typical vegetables included are pumpkin, pumpkin leaf, mustard, mushroom, okra, long beans, cauliflower, chying lap.
 Silu, a curry made with rice powder and chicken, chilli, basil, garlic, and machyang si.
 Bamboo shoots, either salted or preserved is a common side dish.

References

Kachin people
Cuisine by ethnicity